The 1977 Senior League World Series took place from August 15–20 in Gary, Indiana, United States. Taipei, Taiwan defeated Orlando, Florida in the championship game. It was Taiwan's sixth straight championship.

Teams

Results

References

Senior League World Series
Senior League World Series
Baseball competitions in Indiana
Sports in Gary, Indiana
1977 in sports in Indiana